Bernkastel-Wittlich (German: Landkreis Bernkastel-Wittlich) is a district in Rhineland-Palatinate, Germany. It is bounded by (from the north and clockwise) the districts of Vulkaneifel, Cochem-Zell, Rhein-Hunsrück, Birkenfeld, Trier-Saarburg and Bitburg-Prüm.

History 
The district was established in 1969 by merging the former districts of Bernkastel and Wittlich.

Geography 
The district is situated on both banks of the Moselle, which crosses the territory from southwest to northeast. The country rises to the Eifel in the north and the Hunsrück in the south. A great number of tributaries rise in the Eifel and flow into the Moselle. In the very south of the district is the Erbeskopf (818 m), the highest peak in the Hunsrück and Rhineland-Palatinate.

Coat of arms 
The coat of arms displays:
 The cross symbolising the bishopric of Trier
 The crayfish from the arms of Bernkastel-Kues
 The keys from the arms of Wittlich
 The red and white pattern of the County of Sponheim, which ruled this part of the Moselle valley in medieval times

Towns and municipalities

Twin region
At one time, the Borough of Milton Keynes was the twinned region of the district of Bernkastel-Wittlich.

External links 
 Official website (German)

References

 ^ Kreis Bernkastel-Wittlich, Jahrbuch 1982 (page 23ff.), 1982

 
Districts of Rhineland-Palatinate